The Gamble is a 1916 American silent short drama film written and directed by Thomas Ricketts. Set on a farm, the film stars Harold Lockwood and May Allison.

Cast
 Harold Lockwood
 May Allison
 William Stowell
 Harry von Meter

External links

1916 films
1916 drama films
Silent American drama films
American silent short films
American black-and-white films
1916 short films
Films directed by Tom Ricketts
1910s American films